Charles Locke Eastlake (11 March 1836 – 20 November 1906) was a British architect and furniture designer.

His uncle, Sir Charles Lock Eastlake PRA (born in 1793), was a Keeper of the National Gallery, from 1843 to 1847, and from 1855 its first Director, which results in some confusion between the two men, whose names are distinguished only by the presence or absence of an "e" in their middle names.

The style of furniture named after him, Eastlake style, flourished during the later half of the nineteenth century.  The Eastlake movement, a style of architecture, with old English and Gothic elements, is also named for him.

Life
Eastlake was born March 11, 1836, in Plymouth. His formal education included studies at the Westminster School and the Royal Academy where he discovered an interest in architecture, along with the talent for drawing and painting in watercolors. Eastlake furthered his education with three years of travel throughout France, Italy, and Germany, developing his love for medieval building and architecture. Trained by the architect Philip Hardwick (1792–1870), he popularized William Morris's notions of decorative arts in the Arts and Crafts style, becoming one of the principal exponents of the revived Early English or Modern Gothic style popular during the nineteenth century. His book, A History of the Gothic Revival, published in 1872, depicted buildings of English Gothic architectural style and the Gothic Revival built between 1820 and 1870. This was influential to revivalists interested in restoring the language of Gothic tradition in England.

Although he had the qualifications of an architect, Eastlake did not practice as one. In the years 1855 and 1856 he put forward several architectural designs for a number of projects, including a design for the Rugby Town Hall, but all were rejected. In the years following, Eastlake instead focused on journalism, the occasional design of interior goods, and furniture design. He did not make any furniture; his designs were produced by professional cabinet makers.

In 1868 he published Hints on Household Taste in Furniture, Upholstery and other Details, which was very influential in Britain, and later in the United States, where the book was published in 1872. From 1866 to 1877 he was secretary to the Royal Institute of British Architects, and from 1878 to 1898 he was Keeper of the National Gallery, London.

He died, aged 70, at Leinster Square, Bayswater, and was buried at Kensal Green.

Artistic recognition

A bust of Eastlake by John Gibson is held in the National Portrait Gallery, London.

See also
Humewood Castle
Stick-Eastlake

Notes

References

Bibliography 
 A History of the Gothic Revival: an Attempt to Show How the Taste for Mediæval Architecture, which Lingered in England during the Two Last Centuries Has since Been Encouraged and Developed. Publisher: Longmans, Green & Co.,  London  1872; 
 Hints on Household Taste in Furniture, Upholstery, and Other Details.  Edited by Charles C. Perkins. Publisher: J. R. Osgood, Boston  1874
 Notes on the Principal Pictures in the Brera Gallery at Milan. Publisher: Longmans and Co., London 1883; 
 Notes on the Principal Pictures in the Louvre. Publisher: Longmans and Co., London 1883;  1883
 Notes on the Principal Pictures in the Old Pinakothek at Munich. Publisher: Longmans & Co, London 1884; 
 Notes on the Principal Pictures in the Accademia in Venice, 1888
Art for the Nation: Sir Charles Eastlake at the National Gallery. Exhibition at the National Gallery 27 July – 30 October 2011

19th-century English architects
British furniture designers
People from Plymouth, Devon
1836 births
1906 deaths
Architects from Devon